Francis Godolphin Osborne, 5th Duke of Leeds,  (29 January 1751 – 31 January 1799), styled Marquess of Carmarthen until 1789, was a British politician. He notably served as Foreign Secretary under William Pitt the Younger from 1783 to 1791. He also was Governor of Scilly. In 1790, he was made a Knight of the Order of the Garter. As a statesman, he is generally regarded as a failure, and his deep hostility to the newly independent United States damaged relations between the two countries.

Background and education
Carmarthen was the only surviving son of Thomas Osborne, 4th Duke of Leeds, by his wife, Lady Mary, daughter of Francis Godolphin, 2nd Earl of Godolphin, and Henrietta Godolphin, 2nd Duchess of Marlborough. He was educated at Westminster School and at Christ Church, Oxford.

Political career
Carmarthen was a Member of Parliament for Eye in 1774 and for Helston from 1774 to 1775; in 1776 having received a writ of acceleration as Baron Osborne, he entered the House of Lords, and in 1777 Lord Chamberlain of the Queen's Household and Captain of Deal Castle. In the House of Lords he was prominent as a determined foe of the prime minister, Lord North, who, after he had resigned his position as chamberlain, deprived him of the office of Lord Lieutenant of the East Riding of Yorkshire in 1780. He regained this, however, two years later.

Early in 1783, Carmarthen was selected as ambassador to France, but he did not take up this appointment, becoming instead Secretary of State for Foreign Affairs under William Pitt the Younger in December of the same year. Historian Jeremy Black says that in terms of foreign policy, Pitt and other leaders were disappointed with his performance as a minister. The Duke of Leeds, as he became upon his father's death in 1789, was anti-French but did not develop an active and aggressive foreign policy. Instead, King George III himself set the main lines of foreign policy before he became mentally disabled. Pitt's rejection of Leeds' anti-Russian policy was the final blow and he left office in April 1791. 

Leeds had done nothing to foster good relations with the newly independent United States of America: two future Presidents, John Adams and Thomas Jefferson, as envoys from the United States, both complained of his obstructive attitude and "aversion to having anything to do with us". While Adams, who was rather Anglophile by inclination, was prepared to forgive and forget, Jefferson was not, and it can be argued that Leeds's only lasting achievement was to foster Jefferson's implacable hostility as President to Great Britain and its rulers.

Subsequently, Leeds took little part in politics: in 1792, hearing rumours that a new coalition might be formed, he unwisely offered himself as its head and met with a firm rebuff from both Pitt and the King.

Family

Leeds married firstly in 1773 Lady Amelia Darcy, daughter of Robert Darcy, 4th Earl of Holderness on 29 November 1773. Lady Amelia became Baroness Darcy de Knayth and Baroness Conyers in her own right in 1778. They were divorced in 1779. Their marriage produced three children:
 George William Frederick Osborne, Marquess of Carmarthen (21 July 1775 – 10 July 1838), later 6th Duke of Leeds; married Lady Charlotte Townshend, daughter of the 1st Marquess Townshend, on 17 August 1797 and had issue.
 Lady Mary Henrietta Juliana Osborne (7 September 1776 – 21 October 1862); married Thomas Pelham, 2nd Earl of Chichester (28 April 1756 – 4 July 1826) in 1801 and had issue.
 Lord Francis Osborne (18 October 1777 – 15 February 1850), later 1st Baron Godolphin; married The Hon. Elizabeth Eden, third daughter of the 1st Baron Auckland, on 31 March 1800 and had issue.

He married secondly Catherine, daughter of Thomas Anguish, in 1788 and had two more children: 
 Lord Sidney Godolphin Osborne (1789–1861); unmarried.
 Lady Catherine Anne Sarah Osborne (1791–1878); married Major John Whyte-Melville on 1 June 1819 and had issue.

Leeds died in London in January 1799, aged 48, and was buried in the Osborne family chapel at All Hallows Church, Harthill, South Yorkshire. He was succeeded in the dukedom by his eldest son from his first marriage, George Osborne, 6th Duke of Leeds. His second son from his first marriage, Lord Francis Osborne, was created Baron Godolphin in 1832. The dowager Duchess of Leeds died in October 1837, aged 73. Leeds's Political Memoranda were edited by Oscar Browning for the Camden Society in 1884, and there are eight volumes of his official correspondence in the British Museum.

References

1751 births
1799 deaths
Alumni of Christ Church, Oxford
Carmarthen, Francis Osborne, Marquess of
British Secretaries of State for Foreign Affairs
Captains of Deal Castle
Knights of the Garter
Lord-Lieutenants of the East Riding of Yorkshire
Carmarthen, Francis Osborne, Marquess of
Carmarthen, Francis Osborne, Marquess of
Members of the Privy Council of Great Britain
People educated at Westminster School, London
Fellows of the Royal Society
Francis05
105
Burials at Osborne family chapel, All Hallows' Church (Harthill)
Leaders of the House of Lords
Governors of the Isles of Scilly